Qais Essa Hussein (born 1975) was an Iraqi international football player, who played with the Iraqi national football team in 1996 Summer Olympics qual.

Honors

Club
Al-Minaa
Iraqi Premier League
Runner-up (1): 2004–05
Al-Shorta
Iraq FA Cup:
 Runner-up (2): 2001–02, 2002–03
Iraqi Elite Cup
Winners (3): 2000, 2001, 2002
Al-Najaf
Iraqi Premier League
Runner-up (1): 2005–06
Naft Al-Wasat
Iraq Division One
Winners (1): 2013–14 (shared)

References

External links
Qais Essa Hussein page on kooora.com
Al-Minaa Club: Sailors of south

1975 births
Iraqi footballers
Iraq international footballers
Association football fullbacks
Living people
Basra
People from Basra
Sportspeople from Basra
Al-Mina'a SC players
Al-Shorta SC players
Najaf FC players